In enzymology, a dolichyl-diphosphate-polyphosphate phosphotransferase is an enzyme that catalyzes the chemical reaction

dolichyl diphosphate + (phosphate)n  dolichyl phosphate + (phosphate)n+1

Thus, the two substrates of this enzyme are dolichyl diphosphate and (phosphate)n, whereas its two products are dolichyl phosphate and (phosphate)n+1.

This enzyme belongs to the family of transferases, specifically those transferring phosphorus-containing groups (phosphotransferases) with a phosphate group as acceptor.  The systematic name of this enzyme class is dolichyl-diphosphate:polyphosphate phosphotransferase. This enzyme is also called dolichylpyrophosphate:polyphosphate phosphotransferase.

References

 

EC 2.7.4
Enzymes of unknown structure